Pholidobolus is a genus of lizards in the family Gymnophthalmidae. They occur in north-western South America (Peru, Ecuador, and Colombia).

Species
There are 13 species:
Pholidobolus affinis  – Peters's pholiodobolus
Pholidobolus condor 
Pholidobolus dicrus  – Uzzell's prionodactylus
Pholidobolus dolichoderes 
Pholidobolus fascinatus 
Pholidobolus hillisi  
Pholidobolus macbrydei  – MacBryde's pholiodobolus 
Pholidobolus montium  – mountain pholiodobolus
Pholidobolus paramuno 
Pholidobolus prefrontalis  – Montanucci's pholiodobolus 
Pholidobolus samek 
Pholidobolus ulisesi 
Pholidobolus vertebralis  – brown prionodactylus

References 

 
Lizards of South America
Lizard genera
Taxa named by Wilhelm Peters